Powell House may refer to:

In the United States 
Various buildings on the National Register of Historic Places (by state):
 Benjamin T. Powell House, Camden, Arizona, listed on the NRHP
 Powell and Blair Stone Ranch, Proctor, Colorado, listed on the NRHP-listed in Logan County
 William E. and Sarah Dillard Powell House, Dillard, Georgia, listed on the NRHP-listed in Rahun County
 Samuel Powell House, Waterville, Kansas, listed on the NRHP-listed in Marshall County
 Powell House (Wichita, Kansas), listed on the NRHP-listed in Sedgwick County
 William S. Powell House, Princeton, Kentucky, listed on the NRHP-listed in Caldwell County
 Powell-Vail House, Pheba, Mississippi, listed on the NRHP-listed in Clay County
 Chew-Powell House, Blenheim, New Jersey, listed on the NRHP
 Elsie K. Powell House, Old Chatham, New York, a Quaker conference and retreat center
 Powell-Brookshire-Parker Farm, Ellerbe, North Carolina, listed on the NRHP in Richmond County
 Powell House (Fair Bluff, North Carolina), listed on the NRHP
 Williams-Powell House, Orrum, North Carolina, listed on the NRHP
 Powell House (Wake Forest, North Carolina), listed on the NRHP
 Henry Powell House, Cincinnati, Ohio, listed on the NRHP
 Andrew Powell Homestead, Findlay, Ohio,  listed on the NRHP-listed in Hancock County
 Curtis W. Powell House, Dayton, Oregon,  listed on the NRHP-listed in Yamhill County
 John Powell House, Coatesville, Pennsylvania, listed on the NRHP
 Powell Farm (Coatesville, Pennsylvania), listed on the NRHP
 Mathews-Powell House, Queen City, Texas, listed on the NRHP
 David Powell House, Beaver, Utah, listed on the NRHP-listed in Beaver County
 Hook-Powell-Moorman Farm, Hales Ford, Virginia, listed on the NRHP
 Powell-McMullan House, Stanardsville, Virginia, listed on the NRHP
 Powell House (Yakima, Washington), listed on the NRHP
 Powell-Redmond House, Clifton, West Virginia, listed on the NRHP

See also 
 Powel House, Society Hill, Philadelphia, Pennsylvania